Salem United Methodist Church may refer to:
Salem Methodist Episcopal Church (Clinton, Indiana), also known as Salem United Methodist Church
Salem Methodist Episcopal Church and Parsonage (Newport, Kentucky), also known as Salem United Methodist Church
Salem First United Methodist Church, in Salem, Oregon